The 48th ISSF World Shooting Championships were held in Lahti, Finland from July 2 to July 16, 2002.


Medal count

World records 
Several world records were equalled or bettered in Lahti. Especially in women's 300 m Rifle and women's running target, both non-Olympic (so there are few other occasions for them) and both relatively new on the program, were records wiped away.

Rifle

Men

Women

Pistol

Men

Women

Shotgun

Men

Women

Running target

Men

Women

Notes and references 

 Full results (ISSF website)

ISSF World Shooting Championships
World Shooting Championships
Sports competitions in Lahti
S
2002 in Finnish sport
Shooting competitions in Finland